Helichrysum rupestre is a species of plant in the family Asteraceae.

Morphology 
It is a perennial, bushy plant, up to 40 cm tall, covered with a thick whitish down.

The stem, woody at the base, has a thick ascending ramification, with linear leaves, about 4 cm long, tomentose, spaced out on the stem and terminal inflorescences in flower heads.

Distribution and habitat 
The species is widespread in western Mediterranean countries: Spain (including the Balearic Islands), southern Italy, Sardinia and Sicily, and Maghreb countries.

It thrives on limestone cliffs near the sea.

References

DC., Prodr. 6: 182 (1838).
Mercè Galbany-Casals, Llorenç Sáez, Carles Benedí. (2006). Conspectus of Helichrysum Mill. sect. Stoechadina (DC.) Gren. & Godr. (Asteraceae, Gnaphalieae)

rupestre